Voskresensky (masculine), Voskresenskaya (feminine), or Voskresenskoye (neuter) may refer to:

People 
Alexander Voskresensky (1809–1880), Russian chemist
Vasily Voskresensky (1880–1951), Russian ballet impresario, better known as Wassily de Basil
Leonid A. Voskresenskiy (1913–1965), Soviet rocket engineer and launch director for Sputnik 
Mikhail Voskresensky (1935– ), Russian Pianist
Yury Voskresensky (1977– ), Belarusian politician and businessman

Places 
Voskresensky District, several districts in Russia
Voskresensky (inhabited locality) (Voskresenskaya, Voskresenskoye), several inhabited localities in Russia
Voskresenskoye Settlement, a municipal formation in Novomoskovsky Administrative Okrug of the federal city of Moscow, Russia

Other 
Voskresensky Gate, the only existing gate in Kitai-gorod, Moscow, Russia
Voskresenskiy, lunar impact crater named after Leonid A. Voskresenskiy

See also
Voskresensk
Voskresenovka